Margie is a feminine nickname and given name.

Margie may also refer to:

 "Margie" (song), a 1920 jazz standard by Con Conrad, J. Russel Robinson and Benny Davis
 Margie (TV series), a 1960s situation comedy
 Margie (1946 film), a film starring Jeanne Crain
 Margie (1940 film), an American comedy film
 Margie, Minnesota, United States, an unincorporated community
 Margie, Alberta, Canada, a locality 
 Margie (journal), a literary journal also known as American Journal of Poetry

See also
 Margi
 Margy
 Marji